The Karate India Organisation (KIO) replaced Karate Association of India (KAI) as the national governing body for Karate in India on confirmation from  World Karate Federation (WKF) on 15 November 2021.

KIO is incorporated as a non profitable company under section 8 of Registrar of Companies, Govt. of India and established for the overall development of Karate Sport in India affiliated with  World Karate Federation (WKF) ,  Asian Karate Federation (AKF), South Asian Karate Do Federation (SAKF) and Commonwealth Karate Federation (CKF) from November 2021 to present.

Since 2019 there have been many disputes from  the office bearers of the previous governing body of (KAI),  World Karate Federation (WKF) de-recognition of Karate Association of India in accordance with the WKF Statutes  and on 22 June 2020. Due to which the Sports Authority of India (SAI) and the Ministry of Youth Affairs and Sports, Government of India (MYAS) has de-recognized Karate and its governing federations are no more considered as National Sports Federation (NSF) under the Ministry of Youth Affairs and Sports, Government of India (MYAS) which is one of the major backlash for karate in india since 2020. 

On 15 November 2021 in Dubai at occasion of the 25th Senior World Karate Championship in the  World Karate Federation (WKF) Congress has decided to permanently disaffiliate the Karate Association of India (KAI) from the (WKF) and give permanently affiliate recognition member to Karate India Organisation (KIO) and (WKF) also notify to the  Indian Olympic Association (IOA) and Ministry of youth Affairs and Sports about the decision taken by the World Karate Federation (WKF) Congress in Dubai, UAE for the Permanently affiliate Karate India Organisation (KIO) as the  World Karate Federation (WKF) Member in India. thus ratifying the earlier decision of the  World Karate Federation (WKF) Executive Committee (WKF EC) - in accordance with the Olympic charter Rule 28 to bring relief to the affected Karate Athletes of the whole country (India).

(KAI)  was National Sports Federation for Karate Sports in India recognised by Government of India, Ministry of Youth Affairs and Sports until 2020 and was affiliated with  World Karate Federation (WKF) ,  Asian Karate Federation (AKF), South Asian Karate Do Federation (SAKF) and Commonwealth Karate Federation (CKF) from September 2013 to September 2020.

(KIO) now is only association or federation to select the athletes to represent country at  Asian Games, World Karate Championships , Asian Karate Championships, Commonwealth Karate Championships , South Asian Karate Championship, World Youth Cup, Karate 1 Premier League, USA Open Karate Championship  and other Good Will International Tournaments.

Tournaments

National Karate Championship 
 The National Championships are held annually for Senior, U-21, Junior, Cadet and Sub Junior levels.
KIO is only sports body to promote the tremendous art of Karate Sports in all over India at School, Colleges, university and Corporate level not only as a Martial Art of Self Defence but also as a Sport. Karate Sports is now a medal event in Olympic, School Games, National Games, SAF Games & Asian Games, World Games, Youth Olympic and Karate duly recognised by International Olympic Committee.

World Karate Championship

Senior World Karate Championship 2021
 The India National Karate Team Under the Banner of Karate India Organisation (KIO) successfully participated in The 25th Senior World Karate Championship from 16 to 21 November 2021 in Dubai, United Arab Emirates. Under the banner of Karate India Organisation (KIO) and Captainship of Mr. Aniket Gupta.

Junior World Karate Championship 2022
 The India National Karate Team Under the Banner of Karate India Organisation (KIO) successfully participated in The 12th Cadet, Junior & U21 World Karate Championship 2022 from 26 to 30 October 2022 in Konya, Turkey.

Asian Karate Championship 2021
 The India National Karate Team Under the Banner of Karate India Organisation (KIO) successfully participated in The  2021 Asian Karate Championships held in Almaty, Kazakhstan from 20 to 22, December 2021 under the banner of Karate India Organisation (KIO) and Captainship of Mr. Aniket Gupta.

Asian Karate Championship 2022
 The India National Karate Team Under the Banner of Karate India Organisation (KIO) successfully participated in The  2022 Asian Karate Championships held in Tashkent, Uzbekistan from 18 to 20, December 2022 under the banner of Karate India Organisation (KIO) and Captainship of Mr. Aniket Gupta.

Affiliated Associations 
Karate India Organisation (KIO) has 36 State/Province Members all over India along with Services Sports Control Board (SSCB), Army, CRPF, ITBP. Assam Rifles and many Police Forces as a Corporate Members.

KIO Presidents

KIO Secretary Generals

KAI Presidents

KAI Secretary Generals

Athlete
List of Athlete names of the India National Karate Team who represent India at international level competitions: Asian Games, World Karate Championships , Asian Karate Championships, Commonwealth Karate Championships , South Asian Karate Championship, Thailand open Karate tournament, World Youth Cup, Karate 1 Premier League, USA Open Karate Championship,  and other Good Will International Tournaments.

Captain
Aniket Gupta represented India National Team for international competitions: the World Karate Championship, Asian Karate Championship, Commonwealth Karate Championship and many Recognised International Tournaments through National Sports Federation of Karate - NSF Recognised by: Govt. of India (Ministry of Sports & Youth Affairs) as Team Captain of Indian Karate Team (from 2011-2020).

Coach
List of the Coaches of the India National Karate Team who was represent India at international competitions: Asian Games, World Karate Championships , Asian Karate Championships, Commonwealth Karate Championships , South Asian Karate Championship, World Youth Cup, Karate 1 Premier League, USA Open Karate Championship  and other Good Will International Tournaments.

References

External links 
 Karate India Organisation official website
 World Karate Federation official website

Sports governing bodies in India
Karate in India
Karate organizations
2018